Boreal Point is a headland forming the west side of Rockpepper Bay, along the north coast of Joinville Island. It was surveyed by the Falkland Islands Dependencies Survey in 1953–54. The feature was so named by the UK Antarctic Place-Names Committee because of its position on the north ("boreal") coast of Joinville Island.

References
 

Headlands of the Joinville Island group